was a Japanese scholar, conventionally ranked as one of the Four Great Men of Kokugaku (nativist) studies, and one of the most significant theologians of the Shintō religion.

Biography

Early life
Little is known of his early childhood, but it appears he was impoverished and faced hostility from his step-mother. He left home in 1795, renouncing his ties to his family and to the Domain and traveled to Edo and worked as a laborer and as a servant, while pushing opportunities to study rangaku, geography, and astronomy. In 1800, at the age of 25, he caught the attention of Hirata Tōbē (平田藤兵衛), a scholar and instructor in the Yamaga school of military strategy, formerly of Bitchū-Matsuyama Domain, who adopted him and from whom he received the family name of Hirata. Around this time, he met his future wife, the daughter of Ishibashi Tsunefusa (石橋常房), a hatamoto of Numazu Domain, whom he married the following year. Evidently the two became romantically involved while Hirata was working as a menial servant in the Ishibashi household. Taking his family name, she was known as Hirata Orise (平田織瀬).

Development of Kokugaku studies

While in Edo, Hirata was a student of the Neo-Confucianism of Yamazaki Ansai (1619–1682); however, his interests were very broad. Concerned by Russian raids and incursions into north Ezo (today's Sakhalin and the Kuril Islands), he studied modern Dutch medicine under the surgeon . His studies under Yoshida included at least one human dissection. He later turned towards Daoism as found in the works of the Chinese philosopher Zhuangzi. He learned about the works of Motoori Norinaga, the founder of the kokugaku movement, in 1803,  two years after Motoori's death. Hirata claimed later to have received the mantle of kokugaku teacher in a dream directly from Motoori Norinaga, but the story is apocryphal. He became a student of Motoori Haruniwa, and read voraciously the ancient and Chinese classics, foreign works by Nicolaus Copernicus and Isaac Newton and treatises on Buddhism and Shinto. He was also a prolific writer. Representative works in the study of ancient Japanese traditions include Tama no mihashira, Koshi seibun, Kodō taii and Zoku shintō taii, and the commentaries Koshichō and Koshiden. He is also noted for his studies of ancient Indian and Chinese tradition (Indo zōshi and Morokoshi taikoden), and texts dealing with the spirit world, including Senkyō ibun and Katsugorō saisei kibun. His early work Honkyō gaihen indicates an acquaintance with Christian literature that had been authored by Jesuits in China. Orise died in 1812.

Though he is traditionally ranked fourth in the lineage of kokugaku scholars, Hirata actually represents a break with the purely scholarly urban culture characteristic of the revival of classical nativist learning, and represents a trend toward a populist message. Hirata laid particular emphasis on reaching the average man, and adapted his own style to them by employing at times the vernacular idiom. Hirata frequently expressed hostility to the Confucian and Buddhist scholars of the day, advocating instead a revival of the “ancient ways” in which the emperor was to be revered. Hirata's first published work, Kamōsho (1803) was a scathing attack on the works of Confucian philosopher Dazai Shundai (1680–1747)  on Buddhism, and resulted in an invitation to teach from the Yoshida family, the hereditary clan leading Yoshida Shinto.

The contents of his 1841 treatise Tenchō mukyūreki, in which he suggested that loyalty to the Emperor ought to take precedence over loyalty to one's lord (i.e. the shogun), angered the ruling Tokugawa government, and he was sentenced to house arrest in Akita until his death in 1843.

Influence
Hirata's activities eventually attracted over 500 pupils, including Okuni Takamasa and Suzuki Shigetane. His nationalist writings had considerable impact on the samurai who supported the Sonnō jōi movement and who fought in the Boshin War to overthrow the Tokugawa Shogunate during the Meiji Restoration.

Hirata's influence on kokugaku has recently been thought to be overestimated. While he is called one of the "four great men of kokugaku", this is a phrase he invented himself.  His work more often influenced religious groups than the government in the Empire of Japan.

Among Hirata's more enduring contributions to Japanese thought was to remind that all Japanese were descended from the kami, not only the Imperial family and certain aristocratic families. As he put it, "this, our glorious land, is the land in which the kami have their origin, and we are one and all descendants of the kami. For this reason, if we go back from the parents who gave us life and being, beyond the grandparents and great-grandparents, and consider the ancestors of ancient times, then the original ancestors of those must necessarily have been the kami."

Hirata Atsutane's grave

Hirata died at his home in Nakakame-cho, Akita in 1843, and as per the provisions of his will, was buried on a hillside in the city.  The tombstone is a natural stone simply inscribed with his name, surrounded by a stone fence and a stone torii gate are placed at the entrance. The tomb was designated a National Historic Site of Japan in 1934.

Selected works

 
 
 
 
 
 
  
 
 
 
 
 
 
 
 
 
 
 
 
 

Notes
1.The name was inspired by a passge from the Zhuangzi. Although the term is today generally translated as "ocean", its use in classical Chinese literature with which Hirata had intimate familiarity included a more general meaning of vast profundity and was used metaphorically with regard to qi and its source. "Zhun Mang (諄芒), on his way to the ocean, met with Yuan Feng on the shore of the eastern sea, and was asked by him where he was going. 'I am going,' he replied, 'to the ocean;' and the other again asked, 'What for?' Zhun Mang said, 'Such is the nature of the ocean (大壑, dàhè) that the waters which flow into it can never fill it, nor those which flow from it exhaust it. I will enjoy myself, rambling by it.'"
2.A treatise on national defense advocating a military buildup on Sakhalin and throughout the Kuriles to counter Russian expansion into Northeast Asia.
3.This text's name is a pun on the strongly anti-Shinto Tominaga Nakamoto's 1745 , or "Discourse upon Emerging from Meditation".

See also
Hayashi Ōen
List of Historic Sites of Japan (Akita)
Hirata Kanetane (1799-1880)
Hirata Nobutane (1828-1872)
Hirata Moritane (1863-1945)
Hirata Munetane (????-1973)

References

Further reading
 ; ;  OCLC 49704795
 ;  OCLC 44090600

External links

Encyclopedia of Shinto
Akita Prefecture official site 
NIkaho Tourist Information 

1776 births
1843 deaths
Kokugaku scholars
People from Akita (city)
Samurai
Japanese nationalists
Japanese priests
Japanese educators
Japanese theologians
19th-century Japanese philosophers
Anti-Christian sentiment
Critics of Buddhism
Japanese Shintoists
Japanese writers of the Edo period
Writers from Akita Prefecture
Shinbutsu bunri
Deified Japanese people
Historic Sites of Japan